Vice Raid is a 1959 B-movie crime drama directed by Edward L. Cahn and starring Mamie Van Doren and Richard Coogan. It was issued on a double bill with Inside the Mafia.

Plot

Police Sgt. Whitey Brandon works for the Vice Squad and is determined to beat corruption in the city. He encounters Carol Hudson who is working as a model. She is sent to frame him and succeeds. Carol's sister comes to visit and is raped and bashed by a thug who knows Carol. Carol, desperate for revenge, enlists the help of Brandon to fight the thugs who attacked her sister.

Cast

Mamie Van Doren as Carol Hudson
Richard Coogan as Police Sergeant Whitey Brandon
Brad Dexter as Vince Malone
Barry Atwater as Phil Evans
Carol Nugent as Louise Hudson
Frank Gerstle as Captain William Brennan
Joseph Sullivan as Police Sergeant Ben Dunton
Chris Alcaide as Eddie

Production
Van Doren signed a three-picture deal with producer Edward Small but Vice Raid was the only film she made for him.

References

External links
 

Films directed by Edward L. Cahn
1960 films
Films produced by Edward Small
1950s English-language films
1960s English-language films